Starburst is a collection of science fiction stories by American writer Alfred Bester, originally published in paperback by Signet Books in 1958. Signet issued at least four reprint editions of the collection over more than twenty years; British editions were published by Sphere Books and Pan Books.

Contents
 "Disappearing Act" (Star 1953)
 "Adam and No Eve" (Astounding 1941)
 "Star Light, Star Bright" (F&SF 1953)
 "The Roller Coaster" (Fantastic 1953)
 "Oddy and Id" (Astounding 1950)
 "The Starcomber" (F&SF 1954)
 "Travel Diary" (original)
 "Fondly Fahrenheit" (F&SF 1954)
 "Hobson’s Choice" (F&SF 1952)
 "The Die-Hard" (original)
 "Of Time and Third Avenue" (F&SF 1951)

"Oddy and Id" was originally published as "The Devil's Invention". "The Starcomber" was originally published as "5,271,009".

Reception
Anthony Boucher praised Starburst as "one of the most notable single-author collections ever published in our field."

References

1958 short story collections
Short story collections by Alfred Bester
Books with cover art by Richard M. Powers
Signet Books books